The Arda dam, also known as the Wadi Arda dam, is a dam in Saudi Arabia opened in 1984 and located in Tayif city of Mecca region. The main purpose of the dam is flood control.  The estimated cost of the dam is SR140 million (US 37,33 million).

See also 
 List of dams in Saudi Arabia

References 

Dams in Saudi Arabia
Dams completed in 1984
1984 establishments in Saudi Arabia